Lachulung La (el. ), or Lāchālūng La or Lungalacha La, is a paved motorable mountain pass in Ladakh in India just north of border with Himachal Pradesh. Rail-cum-road tunnel is being constructed under this pass to cater for the traffic for existing  NH3 & under-construction Bhanupli–Leh line, Bara-lacha la (84 km south of Lungalacha La) and Taglang La (87 km north of Lungalacha La) are other tunnels being constructed on this route.

This is one of the easier  passes and it can be traversed cross-country by moving along the nala on both sides.  However, due to elevation, the hikers face breathlessness during climb and those who have not undergone acclimatisation may face severe symptoms of altitude sickness.

See also 

 Geography of Ladakh
 India-China Border Roads
 List of mountain passes of India

References

Mountain passes of Ladakh